Lady Brown may refer to:

Margaret Cecil, Lady Brown (1689–1782), society patroness and antagonist of the composer Handel
Lady Brown (song), Japanese hip hop song by Nujabes